The Knuckles Mountain Range lies in central Sri Lanka, in the Districts of Matale and Kandy. The range takes its name from a series of recumbent folds and peaks in the west of the massif which resemble the knuckles of clenched fist when viewed from certain locations in the Kandy District. Whilst this name was assigned by early British surveyors, the Sinhalese residents have traditionally referred to the area as Dumbara Kanduvetiya meaning Mist-laden Mountain Range.

The higher montane area is often robed in thick layers of cloud. In addition to its aesthetic value, the range is of great scientific interest. It is a climatic microcosm of the rest of Sri Lanka as the conditions of all the climatic zones in the country are exhibited in the massif. At higher elevations there is a series of isolated cloud forests, harbouring a variety of flora and fauna. Although the range constitutes approximately 0.03% of the island's total area, it is home to a significantly higher proportion of the country's biodiversity. The isolated Knuckles range harbours several relict, endemic flora and fauna that are distinct from central massif. More than 34 percent of Sri Lanka's endemic trees, shrubs, and herbs are only found in these forests. Knuckles Conservation Forest was included in UNESCO natural world heritage list in 2010 as part of Central Highlands of Sri Lanka.

Knuckles Peaks 
There are nine peaks over 1200 meters (4000 ft) in Knuckles Range. The highest peak, "Gombaniya" is 1906 meters (6248 Ft). Highest of knuckle shaped five peaks is at 1864m while Knuckles-Kirigalpotta  1647m (not to be confused with Horton Plains Kirigalpotta, 2nd highest peak of Sri Lanka), Aliyawetunaela 1647m, Dumbanagala 1644m, Yakungegala 1586m, Dothalugala 1575m, Wamarapugala 1559m, Koboneelagala 1555m, Kalupahana (Thunthisgala) 1628m, Rilagala 1605m, Telambugala 1331m, Nawanagala (1488m), Lakegala 1310m, Maratuwegala 1190m, Balagiriya 1148m, Velangala 1180m, Lahumanagala 1114m, Kinihirigala 1068m, and Lunumadalla 1060m are among the other peaks.

Threats
Cultivation of cardamom at large scale in the montane forests is a major threat to the fragile forest ecosystem.

Invasive exotic plant species such as Mist Flower (Ageratina riparia) that increasingly spread into montane forest areas and montane grasslands destroy the unique native Sri Lankan flora.

References

Further reading
Goonewardene, S., J. Drake, and A. De Silva. 2006. The Herpetofauna of the Knuckles Range. Project Knuckles 2004 and 2005: University of Edinburgh Research Expedition. Amphibia and Reptile Research Organisation of Sri Lanka (ARROS).
Cooray, P.G.,1984. An introduction to the geology of Sri Lanka. Department of Geology. Government printing Press, Colombo, Sri Lanka.

External links

Mountain ranges of Sri Lanka
Landforms of Central Province, Sri Lanka
Geography of Kandy District
Geography of Matale District